The Authentic Party of the Mexican Revolution was a Mexican political party that existed from 1954 to 2000. For most of its existence, the PARM was generally considered a satellite party of the governing Institutional Revolutionary Party (PRI).

The PARM was founded by a group of veterans of the Mexican Revolution who had been marginalized in the PRI, led by Juan Barragán and Jacinto B. Treviño, both revolutionary generals who had held important governmental positions. The foundation of the PARM was supported by President Adolfo Ruiz Cortines, who saw a way to have an officially independent party that would support the efforts of the PRI and would give the appearance of democratic competition in elections and in Congress.

From their founding to 1988, the PARM did not present a separate candidate to the presidency, instead backing the PRI candidates and supporting presidential proposals in Congress. It was only an independent competitor in one city, Nuevo Laredo, where it won the municipal presidency.

In 1988, the PARM broke from the PRI for the first time as it became the first party to nominate Cuauhtémoc Cárdenas Solórzano for president, leading to the beginning of the National Democratic Front. However, after the elections ended, it refused to be a member of the new party formed by Cárdenas Solórzano alongside the Mexican Socialist Party and returned to its usual role as a satellite of the PRI.

The PARM lost its registry in 1994, but it briefly reappeared in 1999. The party nominated Porfirio Muñoz Ledo for president in 2000. One month prior to the election, the widening rift between the candidate and party leadership led to Muñoz Ledo resigning from his candidacy in favor of Vicente Fox. The party refused to recognize Muñoz Ledo's move but did not select a replacement candidate and definitively lost its registry in the ensuing election.

PARM presidents
Juan Barragán (1957–74)
Carlos Cantú Rosas
Rosa María Martínez Denegri
Carlos Guzmán Pérez (1999-2000)

PARM candidates
(1958): Adolfo López Mateos (allied with PRI and PPS)
(1964): Gustavo Díaz Ordaz (allied with PRI and PPS)
(1970): Luis Echeverría Álvarez (allied with PRI and PPS)
(1976): José López Portillo (allied with PRI and PPS)
(1982): Miguel de la Madrid (allied with PRI and PPS)
(1988): Cuauhtémoc Cárdenas Solórzano (allied with PPS, PFCRN and PMS to form National Democratic Front)
(1994): Álvaro Pérez Treviño
(2000): Porfirio Muñoz Ledo

See also
List of political parties in Mexico

References

Political parties established in 1954
Political parties disestablished in 2000
Defunct political parties in Mexico
Institutional Revolutionary Party breakaway groups
1954 establishments in Mexico
2000 disestablishments in Mexico